Sergi Bruguera won in the final 7–6(9–7), 6–1, defeating Karel Nováček.

Seeds

Draw

Finals

Top half

Bottom half

External links
 Main draw

Portugal Open
Estoril
Estoril Open